Toni Janke is an Australian soul singer.

She is a mother of two, a singer/songwriter/musician and is one of Australia's youngest Indigenous university graduates.  She won a Deadly in 2002 for Female Artist of The Year Janke has Aboriginal and Torres Strait Islander heritage. Toni holds qualifications in arts, law, ministry and theology. She set up her own independent music label, Toni Janke Productions in the 1990s and is a coach, mentor and consultant who runs her own business.

Discography
Heart Speak Out ep
The Brink
Jewel of the North
Eternal

References

Living people
Australian women singers
Indigenous Australian musicians
Year of birth missing (living people)